Satyanath is a Hindu festival, involving a week of religious celebration practised by Indian Tamil Brahmins. Satyanath is characterized by the four-day celebration period, in which practising Hindus must perform complex rituals in front Munther, or alter

During the days of celebration, Hindus must remain at home, and refrain from leaving except for school and other financial work.

Practice 

The practice of Satyanath has decreased drastically since its inception. Only a small number of practicing Hindus actually perform the necessary rituals, and many celebrate symbolically by consuming the Sathvik diet, a special diet conceived for the celebration.

Reason for Celebration 

Satyanath, which literally means "connection to home", is a celebration practiced only by Hindus who have immigrated from their home village. The celebration involves reciting mantras, or verses from the Holy Book, which would supposedly link the family to their original home.

The leader of the family, usually the oldest male, must recite the Puncha Shankar at the start and end of the celebration, which starts and ends the connection

Notes and references

Hindu festivals
Festivals in Tamil Nadu
Religious festivals in India